The 1972–73 season was Port Vale's 61st season of football in the Football League, and their third successive season (ninth overall) in the Third Division. Their promotion efforts ended with a sixth-place finish, whilst in the two cup competitions they lost out to Newcastle United and West Ham United. Opposition managers condemned the players as overly physical, whilst off the pitch there were sporadic scenes of violence as football hooliganism gripped the club, and the sport in general.

Overview

Third Division
The pre-season saw Gordon Lee make a number of big signings. The most significant was the signing of Ray Williams from Stafford Rangers, who had scored 47 goals for the non-league club the previous season. Williams cost Vale £3,000 and was on a wage of £40 a week (plus incentives). Also arriving was midfielder Freddie Goodwin (Southport); 'controversial' goalkeeper Alan Boswell (Bolton Wanderers); young midfielder Colin Tartt (Alsager College); and trialist goalkeeper Reg Edwards (Nuneaton Borough). Ticket prices were raised to between 40 and 60 pence, whilst season tickets were priced between £8 and £10.

The season opened with six victories in eight league games, though the third match was a huge 7–0 defeat at Millmoor to Rotherham United – the defeat was blamed on Boswell. After mid-September the "Valiants" struggled to score, and recorded six draws in eight games, though they remained in the top three. The club spent £8,500 on new floodlights and a public address system, however attendances dropped off from the crucial 6,000 break-even number. Lee complained about the lack of support, and said "the people here are not genuinely interested in league football". Offered the management position at Shrewsbury Town, he rejected the offer as he believed the club 'lacked potential' and that he had a 'feeling of loyalty towards the [Vale] players'. Going into the Christmas period Brian Horton was struck by injury, and the team struggled, heading down the league with inconsistent play. In January, Lee sold John James to Chester for £5,000, Ray Harford to Colchester United for £1,750, and Keith Lindsey to Gillingham for £750. To keep up the promotion bid, in February he spent £2,250 to bring 'pacey' striker John Woodward from Walsall. Vale began to pick up wins, though their 2–1 win over Blackburn Rovers led to them being branded by Rovers manager Ken Furphy as 'a brutal and physical side'. Vale lifted themselves into third place, though were out of the race after a 'shattering' 5–0 defeat to Southend United at Roots Hall. Their final home game of the season was a 2–2 draw with champions Bolton Wanderers, in which 'frenzied scenes' included police dogs separating the two sets of fans at the Bycars End, two attempted pitch invasions, and the referee kicked to the ground at the final whistle.

They finished in sixth spot with 53 points, four short of promoted Notts County. The 69 goals conceded tally was higher than that of all but the bottom two clubs.

Finances
On the financial side, a £14,304 profit was made after donations of £16,029 from the Sportsmen's Association and the Development Fund. Gate receipts had risen massively from £36,323 to £67,202. The wage bill stood at £59,663, whilst the club's debt was at £44,721, along with £57,860 owed to the directors. At the end of the season Freddie Goodwin was let go, and he joined Macclesfield Town.

Cup competitions
In the FA Cup, Vale progressed past Fourth Division Southport and then Third Division Wrexham with home victories. In the Third Round they faced  West Ham United at Vale Park, where the "Hammers" won 'an epic battle' 1–0 in front of a season-best crowd of 20,619. The match raised £8,600, but also the issue of violence, as two Londoners were stabbed, two policemen seriously assaulted, and thirty fans ejected from the stadium. West Ham manager Ron Greenwood claimed that the Vale players attempted 'the most blatant calculated intimidation I have ever seen anywhere in the world'.

In the League Cup, the club recorded their first ever away victory in the competition with a 1–0 win over Tranmere Rovers at Prenton Park. The Second Round held a home tie with First Division Newcastle United, and the "Magpies" left Stoke-on-Trent having won 3–1 in front of 10,370 spectators.

League table

Results
Port Vale's score comes first

Football League Third Division

Results by matchday

Matches

FA Cup

League Cup

Player statistics

Appearances

Top scorers

Transfers

Transfers in

Transfers out

Loans out

References
Specific

General

Port Vale F.C. seasons
Port Vale